The 316th Cavalry Brigade of the United States Army is the brigade responsible for the training of U.S. Army Cavalry and Armor officers and non-commissioned officers. The 16th Cavalry Regiment was redesignated as this unit in July 2010. The 316th Cavalry Brigade is currently assigned to Fort Benning, Georgia, in accordance with the Base Realignment and Closure of 2005.

History 
The 316th Cavalry Brigade was established as a subordinate unit of the 8th Tank Destroyer Group in September 1942. It was activated in October of the same year in Camp Hood (now Fort Hood, Texas). It was then inactivated in October 1945 and subsequently re-activated and re-designated as the 316th Cavalry Group in August 1947. After a number of administrative changes, it was inactivated in April 1959 in Roswell, New Mexico.

The United States Army lists its campaign credits as "World War II, Northern France, Rhineland, Ardennes-Alsace, and Central Europe."

On 24 July 2007 it was redesignated as Headquarters and Headquarters Company, 316th Cavalry Brigade and transferred to the United States Army Training and Doctrine Command, and its headquarters was activated on 27 August 2007 at Fort Knox, Kentucky. Its location changed on 1 October 2010 to Fort Benning, Georgia, to replace HQ 16th Cavalry Regiment as the headquarters charged with education of United States Army soldiers in the Armor branch. Its subordinate squadrons, however, retained the nomenclature for the 16th Cavalry Regiment for historical purposes.

Order of battle

Headquarters and Headquarters Troop
The Headquarters and Headquarters Troop is responsible for the day-to-day management of the Brigade, including personnel, intelligence, operations, logistics, and information technology.

1st Squadron, 16th Cavalry Regiment 
The First Squadron, Sixteenth Cavalry Regiment (1-16 CAV) provides support in the form of both soldiers and equipment for the 316th Cavalry Brigade and its subordinate squadrons, as well as for the courses offered through the brigade. Additionally, the squadron is tasked with providing funeral details for soldiers across the south-eastern region of the United States.

The over-six hundred soldier squadron is commanded by Lieutenant Colonel Eric Peterson, and CSM Jeffery S. Dice serves as the Squadron Command Sergeant Major. It is composed of four troops: Alpha "Anvil" Troop, Bravo "Bone Crusher" Troop, Charlie "Cobra" Troop, and Delta "Demon" Company.

2d Squadron, 16th Cavalry Regiment 
The Second Squadron, Sixteenth Cavalry Regiment (or 2-16 Cav) is responsible for the Armor Basic Officer Leaders Course (ABOLC), which provides Initial Entry Training for all newly commissioned officers into the Armor Branch.

3d Squadron, 16th Cavalry Regiment 
The 3rd Squadron, 16th Cavalry Regiment (3-16 CAV) forges Army Leaders to build readiness. It  is responsible for functional leader training and education. The Squadron (SQDN) is organized with the Army’s Department of Reconnaissance and Security, the Department of Combat Power, and the Department of Lethality within the Army University's Armor School at the Maneuver Center of Excellence, Fort Benning, Georgia. The Squadron is commanded by Lieutenant Colonel Jeffrey J. Barta, and CSM Carvet C. Tate serves as the Squadron’s Command Sergeant Major.

The SQDN hosts the following courses:

• Cavalry Leaders Course (CLC)

• Army Reconnaissance Course (ARC)

• Maneuver Leaders Maintenance Course (MLMC)

• Master Gunner Common Core (MGCC)

• Abrams Master Gunner (AMG)

• Bradley Master Gunner (BMG)

• Stryker Master Gunner (SMG)

• Tank Commanders Course (TCC)

• MGS Commanders Course (MGSCC)

• Simulations Training Managers Course (STMC)

• Abrams, Stryker, and Field Maintenance New Equipment Training Team (NETT)

Department of Reconnaissance and Security -Phantom Troop 

The Department of Reconnaissance and Security is the US Army’s premier institution for training Reconnaissance and Security (R&S) knowledge, skills and abilities to leaders assigned to Cavalry formations or US Army and US Military formations conducting reconnaissance-focused operations.  The Department of R&S provides training to leaders from the Squad to Brigade Staff level, and supports R&S training and education throughout the US Army. The cornerstone R&S courses offered at Fort Benning include Army Reconnaissance Course (ARC) and the Cavalry Leaders Course (CLC). The Department of R&S also integrates functionally related R&S training through with the Small Unmanned Aircraft Systems-Master Trainer (SUAS-MT)and the Reconnaissance and Surveillance Leader Course (RSLC).

Department of Lethality - Maverick Troop 

The Department of Lethality educates non-commissioned officers to become the technical and tactical experts on the training and employment of combat platforms - world renown as the experts in their craft.  The Department hosts the following courses: Master Gunner Common Core (MGCC), Abrams Master Gunner (AMG, Bradley Master Gunner (BMG, Stryker Master Gunner (SMG), Tank Commanders Course (TCC, MGS Commanders Course (MGSCC), and the Simulations Training Managers Course (STMC)

Department of Combat Power - Navajo Troop 

The Department of Combat Power travels to Brigade Combat teams to educate operators and leaders about new Abrams and Stryker platforms as well as Field Maintenance through the New Equipment Training Team (NETT).  It also hosts the Maneuver Leaders Maintenance Course (MLMC).

Recent History 

In 2010 the SQDN moved from Fort Knox to Fort Benning and transferred responsibility for the Armor Captains Career Course to 3-81AR creating the Maneuver Career Course. The unit assumed responsibility for all International students training on Fort Benning and all Reconnaissance training. 
As part of the Maneuver Center of Excellence Reorganization in 2014, the squadron was reorganized into three Troop and one Airborne Company.  Assault Company (IN IET Support) was transferred from 2-29 IN which cased its colors in April 2014.  Navajo Troop remained with the squadron and in addition to ARC and CLC assumed control of the SUAS-MT and DCT-MT Courses.  Able Company (AR/CAV/BCT IET Support) was attached from 3-81 AR.  Delta Company was attached from the Ranger Training Brigade and in addition to RSLC assumed responsibility for ASA A&B.  On 1 October 2014, these units were permanently task organized to the 3rd Squadron and renamed A Troop, B Troop, C Troop, and D Company respectively. 
On May 18, 2017 A and C Troops were inactivated and the IET support committees were transferred to the 198th and 194th Brigades. On October 5, 2017, B Troop and D Co. were inactivated. H Troop was re-activated with Vietnam era lineage to support the SQDN. The Reconnaissance and Security (R&S) Courses were re-aligned under  a new Department of R&S while the Department of Security Force Assistance was activated to train Combat advisors for the Security Force Assistance Brigades. On May 4, 2018 the Department of Subterranean Operations was activated. In January of 2019, the Squadron assumed the Maneuver Leaders Maintenance Course (MLMC) under Hawk Troop.  On March 12,2019, the Squadron re-activated M, N, and P Troops as part of a large MCOE re-organization to re-align the Armor and Infantry Schools. RSLC was returned to ARTB as D Co., the SUASMT course, and the SbT program were transferred to 1-29IN in the 199th BDE.  The Master Gunner School returned to 3rd SQDN along with the New Equipment Training Team.   Today the Squadron continues to forge functional skills in excellent leaders to enhance Army readiness in reconnaissance, security, and lethality.

Military Advisor Training Academy
The Combat Advisor Training Course (CATC) is focused on training U.S. Army Foreign Security Forces (FSF) Combat Advisors to serve as members of the Security Force Assistance Brigade. Graduates from the CATC will have the requisite knowledge, skills and attributes to competently train, advise, assist, accompany, and enable FSF. Students will be confident in the knowledge and skills needed to function in complex environments by, through, and with FSF as a member of an advisor team.

Heraldry 
The shield in the shoulder insignia represents "defense and protection of the United States. The color black and the eight stars around the crest represent the original parent unit of the brigade, the 8th Tank Destroyer Group. The colors within the crest, scarlet and white, are the traditional colors of the United States Cavalry, and the color gold represents excellence. The lightning bolt in the center represents "denotes speed, mobility, and effectiveness, the characteristics of the combined forces with which the Brigade cooperates." The saber in the center is part of the United States Cavalry collar insignia.

On the distinctive unit insignia the panther is a symbol of the 8th Tank Destroyer Group.

See also 

 United States Army Training and Doctrine Command
 Armor Basic Officer Leadership Course

References 
4. “3-16th Reorganizes Under University Model” Benning News. October 13, 2017. 

Training brigades of the United States Army
Cavalry brigades of the United States Army
Military units and formations established in 1942